Cashville Records (formerly G-Unit South) is an American independent record label based in Nashville, Tennessee founded by rapper Young Buck. Initially founded as a southern branch of 50 Cent's G-Unit Records, the label became "Cashville Records" in late 2007 after a dispute between 50 Cent and Young Buck led to Buck being banned from using the G-Unit logo or name to distribute his music. The label has signed such acts as The Outlawz, C-Bo, Lil Scrappy, D4L and more.

History
In 2008, The Outlawz were the latest addition to Cashville Records, joining veteran rapper C-Bo, who became a part of the label's roster in January.

In late 2011, it was rumoured that Lil' Kim was signing with the label. She would later confirm this in an interview stating that "If y'all don’t know, this my boy right here. G-Unit South, that’s where it’s at... And I’m family too, down with the G-Unit camp. We got surprises for y'all." she said in an interview with Rap-Up.com. As of 2012, nothing had happened.

Rapper Mystikal also confirms that he himself almost signed to the label in 2012 after he revealed that he got many offers while in prison, including a very attractive deal from Cashville Records. However, he later signed with YMCMB.

In 2012, West coast veteran rapper, C-Bo, released his first album on the label and plans on releasing his second album Orca in 2012 as well.

After Young Buck heard Tha City Paper's mixtape DOPaminE he was quick to sign him to Cashville Records in early 2012. In Summer 2012, both Buck and Paper linked up for a Collaboration mixtape entitled G.a.S - Gangsta and Street, this was the first project Paper released through Cashville Records since he signed to the label.

Newly signed artist Rukus 100 released his first project on the label in early 2013, the project was an Official Mixtape called "Smokin' Out The Pound" soon after a DVD was released also named "Smokin' Out The Pound". These projects were released to help promote Rukus upcoming debut album on Cashville Records Money Hungry.

Artists

Current acts

Former acts

In-house producers
Broadway
 Young Buck
Celsizzle
Fate Eastwood
Coop
Heartbeatz
G.O.T.H.A.M. City
BandPlay

Discography
The following is a list of albums released through Cashville Records. Additional record label involvement is also specified.

Upcoming Releases

References

External links

Record labels based in Nashville, Tennessee
2005 establishments in Tennessee
American independent record labels
Gangsta rap record labels
Hip hop record labels
Record labels established in 2005
Record labels based in Tennessee